Pacific Meridian (abbreviated as IFFV) is an International Film Festival of the Asian-Pacific region, which has been held every September since 2003 in Vladivostok, Russia. Every year it brings together filmmakers from about 108 countries; with more than 1200 films submitted each year.

Festival 

International Film Festival  Pacific Meridian  is  a competition of length and short films, a panorama of world cinema, a program of Russian films, shorts, documentaries and animated films, retrospectives of masters of world cinema, workshops, master classes, etc. One of the distinguishing features of the Film Festival is a specialization of the IFF  Pacific Meridian  on the films of Asian-Pacific region.

International Film Festival of countries of Asian-Pacific region  Pacific Meridian  in Vladivostok was organized in 2003. The film festival is held annually in September by the Ministry of Culture of Russian Federation and Primorsky Region Territory Administration.

Features of the festival  
 Each year the Yul Brynner Award is presented by  Rock Brynner  to the most promising young actor or actress. Yul Brynner was born in Vladivostok.
 Film Festival  Pacific Meridian  is a cultural project  where the  exit  film screenings and artistic encounters of Russian actors and directors with the inhabitants of Primorsky Krai pass. 
 Since 2006, the festival runs the program,  Screentest, which is addressed to first-time filmmakers.
 The sixth International Film Festival  Pacific Meridian  was a presentation of an international project  Cinema train - an international master class for young filmmakers, which took place during the train  Moscow-Vladivostok.  Within two weeks, 18 participants from different European countries traveled throughout Russia, with stops in various cities across the country. During the trip they took six short documentary films on the theme  Where is the border of Europe.  Films were edited in Vladivostok and shown in a program of the IFF. After the world premiere of the film in Vladivostok it has been selected for display at the Cannes Film Festival program.
 Within the bounds of the sixth Pacific Meridian Film Festival from 14 to 17 September, an International Filmsammit  Eurasia  was held. The business program included round tables, seminars, business trainings and discussions on current topics in the field of cinema. It was a special event of the filmsammit  Eurasia, organized jointly with the  Vjugn Consult  company   Russian Co-production and Film Financing Forum, aimed at developing cooperation between Russian, European and Asian investors and financiers, producers, distributors, representatives of public funds financing the film industry.
 Together with  Informkino  company from 14 to 17 of September 2008 was held program  Generation campus, which main objective in 2008 was to promote contribution of co-production debut project. The result was 3 short films shot by young filmmakers   actors of  Generation Campus, with Ingeborga Dapkunaite, Irina Bezrukova, Oksana Akinshina.

Program 

Competition screening includes:
 Features and shorts (up to 30 min)

Non-competition programs:
 Panorama
 Russian Cinema
 Special and Info screenings
 Retrospective screening of the World Cinema Masters
 Seminars and workshops

Jury  
    
To judge competition films there will be an International Jury formed of 5 persons. The Festival covers a round-trip ticket and other expenses for staying in Vladivostok for each International Jury member; the International Jury cannot include anyone involved in production or distribution of any film in the competition; at least one member of the International Jury has to be a film producer.

Location  

Film Festival takes place in Vladivostok, Russia on the basis of the cinema  Ocean,  Ussuri  network Illusion, a summer site of  Seven Feet  yacht club.

Participation  

According to regulations

 Eligible are any films presented by film companies, film studios, independent producers, distributors or any other copyright owners of the films
 DVDs are to be shipped to the Festival Office for preliminary selection 
 In the competitive program are accepted feature and short films on 35 мм, Betacam Digital, Betacam SP, HDCam, DCP with English subtitles, and finished by production no more than a year ago; it can include films that were screened before at other film festivals
 The competition program attended at least 12 films.
 All the professional media formats besides 16 mm are eligible for non-competition programs.

The selection of films  

The selection of films in order to participate in the IFF provides the selection committee. The final decision on the inclusion of film in one of the programs of the Festival takes the Directorate the IFF. Festival Management agrees to inform the participants of the festival about inclusion of the film in program of the Festival. Copies of the films in their original format, taken in the competitive and non-competitive programs must be received by the Directorate prior to the date indicated on the official festival website.

References

External links 
 Official VIFF site

International film awards
Film festivals in Russia
Recurring events established in 2003
2003 establishments in Russia
Culture in Vladivostok